Lucky is a 2012 Kannada-language romantic comedy film directed by Dr. Suri, a dentist by profession, in his directorial debut. It stars Yash and Ramya. Arjun Janya composed music for the film. It was produced by actress-turned-producer, Radhika Kumaraswamy, under Shamika Enterprises, along with the assistance of H. D. Kumaraswamy and V. Raghavendra Bunty. The film released on 24 February 2012. In 2018, the film was dubbed and released in Hindi as Heart Attack 3.

Plot
Vikram Kumar aka Lucky is a happy-go-lucky graduate, who is in love with a TV anchor Gowri, who gives him the cold shoulder, and helping her keep Lucky at an arm's length is her pug dog Zoo Zoo. Gowri is compelled to resign from her job and takes over as creative head of an advertising company. Lucky arrives for a job interview in the company where he learns that Gowri will be providing the job interview and would probably not let him get a job in her workplace.

With the help of his friend Anand aka 420, Lucky takes on a different identity, Vicky, complete with new wardrobe and changed hairstyle. Vicky builds a rapport with Gowri and proposes to her. Then, he learns that she is in love with Lucky. Vicky tries to prove that he himself is Lucky, but to no avail as 420 had already destroyed all the things linked to Lucky on his own advice. Gowri strongly tells Vicky that if he was Lucky, Zoo Zoo would have chased him out.

Vicky resigns from job and later turns up dressed as Lucky. Gowri still rejects him saying she has started adoring Vicky, but later she confesses to Zoo Zoo that she knows both Lucky alias Vicky are the same person and that she is rejecting him as she doesn't want Zoo Zoo to feel abandoned. After seeing how Gowri adores Lucky, Zoo Zoo reunites them.

Cast 
 Yash as Lucky (Vikram "Vicky" Kumar)
 Ramya as Gowri
 Sharan as Anand aka 420, Lucky's friend
 Sadhu Kokila as Outstanding Sadhu
 Chikkanna
 Vijay Chendoor as Hanumantha, Lucky's friend
 Hemanth G Nag as Lucky's colleague

Critical reception

A critic from The Times of India scored the film at 3.5 out of 5 stars and says "Yash for his marvellous performance, perhaps the best in his career so far. Ramya is amazing with her dialogue delivery and expressions. Sharan is sure to make you laugh as Yash's friend. Krishnaa's cinematography is pleasing to the eyes. Music by Arjun Janya has some catchy numbers". Srikanth Srinivasa from Rediff.com scored the film at 3 out of 5 stars and wrote "Parents may soon find themselves being pestered by their kids to get them a pug. Krishna's cinematography is good. The songs by Arjun are catchy. Debutant director Dr Suri needs to be commended for this relaxing, feel-good movie". B S Srivani from Deccan Herald wrote "The dog holds its own before seasoned performers, giving much of the required expressions.Lucky may have just extended the lead pair’s winning streak, is packaged well, but ultimately lacks a story. A pity, that". A critic from News18 India wrote "S Krishna once again proves that he is among the top cinematographers in the Kannada film industry. The weak screenplay and faulty first half make 'Lucky' an average fare despite its top technical content". A critic from DNA wrote "As Vicky builds a rapport with Gowri, he comes to know that she’s pining for Lucky. To get to the bottom of the story and know whether he actually gets the girl, you’d have to watch the film. But suffices to say, it will be worth the effort, if such movies are what you like".

Soundtrack

Arjun Janya composed the background score and music for the film's soundtrack. The album consists of five tracks. Lyrics for the tracks were penned by Ghouse Peer, Shashank, Jayant Kaikini and Yogaraj Bhat.

References

External links 

2012 films
2010s Kannada-language films
Films scored by Arjun Janya
Films shot in Bangalore
Indian romantic comedy films
2012 romantic comedy films